The 1970 Buffalo Bulls football team represented the University at Buffalo in the 1970 NCAA University Division football season. The Bulls offense scored 133 points while the defense allowed 299 points.

Schedule

References

Buffalo
Buffalo Bulls football seasons
Buffalo Bulls football